Quercus austrina, the bastard white oak or bluff oak, is an oak species that is endemic to the southeastern United States from Mississippi to the Carolinas, with a few isolated populations in Arkansas.

Quercus austrina can grow to a height of 45 to 60 feet (13.5–18 meters) with a spread of 35 to 50 feet (10.5–15 m). Leaves are narrow, with shallow rounded lobes. It tends to grow in wet habitats, such as on river bluffs, river bottoms, and flatwoods, and generally over basic substrates, such as mafic rocks, shells, or calcareous sediment.

Quercus austrina specimens have often been misidentified as either Q. sinuata or Q. nigra.

Quercus austrina is tolerant to clay, sand, loam, acidic, and well-drained soils. Also, it requires a lot of sun and its drought tolerance is high.

National champion 
The largest known bluff oak in the United States appeared on the National Register of Champion Trees in 2015. Located in Wakulla, Florida, the national champion specimen of Quercus austrina was nominated in 2009 by George Apthorp and crowned on September 1, 2015. It was last measured in 2014. The American Forests formula for assigning point scores to nominated trees is trunk circumference (in inches) + height (in feet) +  average crown spread (in feet), resulted in an overall score of 275 points.

References

austrina
Endemic flora of the United States
Flora of the Southeastern United States
Trees of the United States
Plants described in 1903
Taxa named by John Kunkel Small